Treadway Russell Nash (24 June 1724 – 26 January 1811) was an English clergyman, now known as an early historian of Worcestershire and the author of Collections for the History of Worcestershire, an important source document for Worcestershire county histories. He was a fellow of the Society of Antiquaries of London.

Early life
Treadway Russell Nash was born on 24 June 1724 born at Clerkenleap, in Kempsey, Worcestershire. His family were from Ombersley. They had lands there and at Claines, and had later bought lands in the Reformation around St Peter's, Droitwich. He was related to James Nash and John Nash, both MPs for Worcester. His father Richard, a grandson of Sir Rowland Berkeley, died in 1740, and Richard's eldest son in 1757. As a result, Treadway Russell Nash inherited the Russells' Strensham estates from his brother, as well as the Nash estates, and took both names.

He was educated from the age of twelve at King's School, Worcester, and became a scholar at Worcester College, Oxford aged fifteen. In March 1749, he accompanied his brother on a trip to the continent, to aid Richard's health. They visited Paris for about six weeks, before spending the summer "on the banks of the Loire". They then visited "Bourdeaux, Thoulouse, Montpelier, Marseilles, Leghorn, Florence, Rome, Naples, Bologna, Venice, Padua, Verona, Milan, Lyons, and again Paris"; such expeditions are often known as the Grand Tour.

On his return in late summer 1751, Nash took up a post as Vicar of Eynsham through his friend and future brother-in-law, John Martin. He also had an income as a tutor at Oxford. He took his Doctor of Divinity degree and left Oxford, having "gone out grand compounder", following the death of his brother. He also left his benefice at Eynsham in 1757. While at Oxford he had proposed a road from there to Witney (now the A40 and B4022), and also stood for Parliament.

Nash married Margaret Martin in 1758, the daughter of John Martin of Overbury. Nash and his wife moved to Claines, Worcestershire, where Nash leased Bevere Manor and later built Bevere House. Then:

Work as an antiquary
In 1773, Nash determined that someone should collect together papers and records relating to Worcestershire. He later related that:

The reception to his work can be seen to be generally very positive. However, they were primarily source material, rather than a true history:

Republishing Samuel Butler
Nash produced a volume with a "literary memoir" of Samuel Butler's Hudibras, a satirical poem about Cromwell's Protectorate written after the Restoration. In 1797, Nash became Rector of Strensham, where Butler had grown up. It was reprinted extensively into the nineteenth century. The edition includes illustrations after William Hogarth.

Death and legacy
Nash died in 1811, at his house in Beveré. He was buried in the family vault at St Peter's Church, Droitwich. His wife, Margaret, died a few months later, aged 78 on 21 May 1811. They were survived by their daughter Margaret, who had married John Somers in 1785.

At his death, he left around £60,000, excluding his estate. He left his artistic collection from his travels in Italy and France to Worcester College, where it remains. His personal papers are at Eastnor Castle, except for his personalised volumes of the Collections, which had been sold and subsequently lost in a fire.

Works

 with notes and a literary memoir by the Rev. Treadway Russel Nash

References

Further reading

External links

People from Worcestershire (before 1974)
Fellows of the Society of Antiquaries of London
1724 births
1811 deaths
Alumni of Worcester College, Oxford